Robert John Sunell  (5 June 1929 – 8 August 2020) was a major general in the United States Army. His assignments included Program Manager of Tank Systems for the United States Army Tank-Automotive Command. Sunell was born in Astoria, Oregon. He received his bachelor's degree in education from University of Nebraska and his masters of science degree from Shippensburg University of Pennsylvania.

References

1929 births
2020 deaths
People from Astoria, Oregon
Military personnel from Oregon
University of Nebraska alumni
Shippensburg University of Pennsylvania alumni
United States Army generals
Burials at Arlington National Cemetery